Flute Talk is an album by Buddy Collette's Quintet featuring James Newton recorded in 1988 in Italy and released on the Soul Note label.

Reception

The AllMusic review by Scott Yanow noted " Although the music is primarily straight-ahead, there are some adventurous moments".

Track listing 
All compositions by Buddy Collette except where noted.
 "Magali" - 5:59	
 "Blues in Torrance" - 6:31	
 "Richmond in Acropolis" (James Newton) - 7:22	
 "It's You" - 5:25
 "Crystal" - 5:06
 "Andr" - 5:54
 "Flute Talk" (Collette, Newton) - 4:31	
 "Roshanda" - 5:54

Personnel 
Buddy Collette - alto saxophone, flute, clarinet
James Newton - flute
Geri Allen - piano
Jaribu Shahid - bass
Giampiero Prina - drums

References 

1989 albums
Black Saint/Soul Note albums
Buddy Collette albums
James Newton albums